"D.I.V.O.R.C.E." is a 1975 UK number-one single by Scottish folk singer and comedian Billy Connolly. A comedy song, it reached No. 1 for one week in November 1975, and was one of the few songs of its genre to reach this milestone.

The song is a cover of Sheb Wooley's parody of the Tammy Wynette song "D-I-V-O-R-C-E", and Connolly's version to date has been his only No. 1 UK single, though in the late 1970s he had a further two UK hits which parodied contemporary songs. He later dropped musical performances from his act.

"D.I.V.O.R.C.E." has a similar theme to Wynette's original in that the events in the song lead to a couple divorcing, however in the parody, the words are spelled out to withhold the truth from a dog rather than a child as in Wynette's version, and the divorce is sparked by a riotous visit to a veterinarian that results in the husband being bitten by both the dog and his wife.

Some versions of the song, such as the live performance included on the album Get Right Intae Him! which was released as the single, are censored, with the letters "f'ing c" being bleeped.

References

1975 singles
1975 songs
Billy Connolly
Novelty songs
Polydor Records singles
Songs about dogs
Songs about marriage
UK Singles Chart number-one singles
Songs about divorce